Petite-Rivière-Saint-François is a municipality in Quebec, Canada, along the Saint Lawrence River. It is considered the gateway to the Charlevoix region.

It is named after the Petite rivière Saint-François, and home to Le Massif ski resort.

History

In June 1603, Samuel de Champlain sailed past there and wrote about the location: "The following Thursday, we left [Hare Island], and lowered the anchor in a dangerous cove on the north side, where there are some meadows and a little river where the Indians sometimes camp." The name Petite Rivière ("Little River") stuck, although over time the place has been identified in many other ways: Cap-Raide, Rivière-du-Sot, Anse-aux-Pommiers, l'Abattis (1695), l'Abatis (1755), Vieille-Rivière, Ruisseau-à-la-Nasse, Cap-Maillard, François-Xavier, Côte-de-Saint-François-Xavier' Saint-François-Xavier-de-la-Petite-Rivière-Saint-François.

In 1675, the Seminary of Quebec, owner of the Beaupré Seignory that stretched from Beauport to Baie-Saint-Paul, granted land to Claude Bouchard, followed by another 15 concessions until the end of the 17th century. The settlement, the oldest in the Charlevoix region, grew at the mouth of the Little River in a deep valley east of Cape Maillard where natural open grassland accommodated the early colonizers. In 1721, the local parish was formed, named Saint-François-Xavier after Francis Xavier, founder of the Jesuits. In 1845, it was incorporated but the municipality was abolished in 1847. In 1855, it was reestablished as the Parish Municipality of Saint-François-Xavier-de-la-Petite-Rivière. In common use, the place remained known as just Petite-Rivière.

In 1986, it changed status and name to become the Municipality of Petite-Rivière-Saint-François.

Demographics
Population trend:
 population in 2021: 953 {2016 to 2021 population change: 17.1%}
 population in 2016: 814 {2011 to 2016 population change: 9.4%}
 Population in 2011: 744 (2006 to 2011 population change: 5.8%)
 Population in 2006: 703 {2001 to 2006 population change: -3.6%}
 Population in 2001: 730 {1996 to 2001 population change: -3.0%}
 Population in 1996: 753 {1991 to 1996 population change:-6.1%}
 Population in 1991: 802

Private dwellings occupied by usual residents: 455 (total dwellings: 858)

Mother tongue:
 English as first language: 1.1%
 French as first language: 98.4%
 English and French as first language: 0.5%
 Other as first language: 0.5%

See also 
 Charlevoix tourist train, a panoramic tour train
 Rivière du Sault (Charlevoix)
 Ruisseau de la Martine
 Rivière du Moulin (Baie-Saint-Paul)

References

External links

Incorporated places in Capitale-Nationale
Municipalities in Quebec